"The Lonely Side of Love" is a song written by Kostas, and recorded by American country music artist Patty Loveless.  It was released in September 1989 as the fourth single from her album Honky Tonk Angel.

Background
This follow-up single to Loveless' number 1 song "Timber" reached number 6 in December, 1989 and is one of her classic country ballad songs about love and heartache. It was written by Kostas, who also wrote "Timber"

The song charted for 30 weeks (her longest to date) on the Billboard Hot Country Singles and Tracks chart, reaching number 6 during the week of December 2, 1989.

Chart positions

Year-end charts

References

1989 singles
Patty Loveless songs
Songs written by Kostas (songwriter)
Song recordings produced by Tony Brown (record producer)
MCA Nashville Records singles
1988 songs